National Law Institute University Bhopal (NLIU Bhopal) is a public law school and a National Law University located in Bhopal, India. Established in 1997 by the State of Madhya Pradesh, it is the second law school established under the National Law School system. In 2022, it was ranked third among law colleges in India by India Today. The university launched its first academic program in 1998, with Indian jurist V.S. Rekhi as the Director. Recognized by the Bar Council of India, the university admits around 120 candidates each year through the Common Law Admission Test UG, for the B.A. LL.B (Hons.) Course and around 60 candidates for the B.Sc. LL.B. (Hons.) [Cyber Security] Course. The post-graduate courses offered at the university are the Masters of Law (LL.M.) degree and the Master of Cyber Law & Information Security (MCLIS) degree.

The university is a member of the Association of Indian Universities and the visitor of the university is the Hon. Chief Justice of India. It works closely with the High Court of Madhya Pradesh, as well as the National Judicial Academy. Since 2009, NLIU has been home to the Rajiv Gandhi National Cyber Law Center, established by the Ministry of Human Resource Development, Government of India.

History 
Justice J.S. Verma had proposed the first National Law School at Bhopal. However, major action would not be taken on this proposition until the National Law Institute University was set up in Bhopal by Act No. 41 of 1997 (or NLIU Act, 1997 which was later substituted by Act No. 06 of 2018). Its first program was launched in 1998, and courses commenced on September 1, 1998.

The Masters of Law (LL.M.) program was launched in 2007, producing its first graduates in 2009. The establishment of Student Bodies, Academic Cells and associations commenced in 2002 with the establishment of the NLIU Moot Court Association. In 2007, the university witnessed the establishment of the Alternative Dispute Resolution Cell (ADRC) and the Cell for Awareness and Research in Environmental Studies (CARES). The Centre for Business and Commercial Law, as well as the Rajiv Gandhi National Cyber Law Centre, were established in 2008.

 The university published the first edition of Indian Law Review in November 2009. The NLIU Law Review was first published in 2010, and the NLIU Journal of Intellectual Property Law was first published in 2012.

Academics

Rankings
 

In 2022, it was ranked 15th on the list of law universities by India's Board of Education National Institute Ranking Framework (NIRF). NLIU was also consistently ranked third among law colleges in India by India Today in 2021 and 2022.

Collaborations 
The university's national and international collaborations include World Bank Projects on Environment Management, Capacity Building, and Land Management,  the DFID Project on Police Reforms, and work with the Food and Agriculture Organization, Italy. The National Research Projects which have been taken up by the university include work with the Ministry of Science and Technology and a number of workshops on the subject of patent claim writing with the Government of India. 

Other collaborations include NLIU's collaboration with IIIT on "Cyber Law and Jurisprudence", NHRC's project on "Water stagnation leading to the death of Tribals in Balaghat", N.U.J.S., Kolkata project on "State-Wise Profile of Criminal Justice Administration".
M.P. State Road Development Authority Project on "Legal Consultancy Services". And "Development of Computerised Expert System in Administrative Law", undertaken by the Govt. of M.P. The university is also involved in a research project in collaboration with United Nations Development Program (UNDP) India on "Examining and Strengthening Informal Justice Systems in Madhya Pradesh". 

The institution has been a partner institute for Surana & Surana National Trial Advocacy Moot Court Competition.

Publication 
The NLIU Law Review is the bi-annual law journal published by the university. The first issue of the journal was published in May 2010.

Student activities 

The co-curricular activities of the university are regulated and overseen by the various committees which are in existence. The following committees handle the main co-curricular activities taking place in the university. All the committees are run by students with a faculty in charge.

Moot Court Association

The Moot Court Association plays an important role in encouraging mooting activity on campus. The association has hosted various national-level moot court competitions, including the Annual Inter-University Bar Council of India Trust Moot Court Competition and the Stetson International Law Moot Court Competition, along with the university's own moot court competition, the Justice R.K. Tankha Memorial National Moot Court Competition, the 3rd edition of which was successfully organised in 2009. The MCA organised 2nd NLIU-Justice R.K. Tankha Memorial International Moot Court Competition from 17 February 2017 to 19 February 2017 with the participation of over 30 National and International Teams.

The M.C.A. is also responsible for organizing selections for the National Moot Speakers' Pool and National Moot Researchers' Pool, International Moot Speakers' Pool, Researchers' Pool and the fresher's pool specifically meant for the first years undergrad. students as well as the Client Counselling Pool, which are dissolved and re-elected annually. Only the students in the pools are allowed to represent the university in such competitions, which maintains the level of quality that NLIU holds essential to its status as a premier law school in India. The selection process of the M.C.A. includes general elections for II - V year representatives, and an M.C.A. induction debate for freshers.  The M.C.A. also maintains the M.C.A. blog for its activities, managed by the M.C.A. executives for the students of NLIU.

Jus Cultura 
Jus Cultura is the Literary, Debating and Quizzing Society of the university. The society selects students for the 2 on 2 and the 3 on 3 debate pool, through the NLIU Debating League, and the Quiz Pool through the Jus Cultura Quiz. The society participates in debates in the International Debating Circuit, the Worlds Debate, the Asians' Debate, the Mukherji Memorial Debate and the N.L.S. Debate.

Alternate Dispute Resolution Cell 
The Alternative Dispute Resolution Cell (ADRC) of National Law Institute University was instituted in the month of March 2007. ADRC has a 40-member team of students from all the batches of NLIU. In 2008-09 the Cell also hosted India's Former President Dr. A.P.J Abdul Kalam for his lectures at the university. NLIU, in collaboration with International Academy of Dispute Resolution (INADR) also hosts an annual International Mediation Tournament.

CRIL

The Centre for Research in International Law (CRIL) is a student run body at National Law Institute University, which was established with an aim to increase awareness of international law and policy among students. It seeks to ensure an active and inclusive atmosphere, in collaboration with various esteemed organizations wherein an interface between like-minded students and the extensive area of international law is created. CRIL is the official Bhopal Chapter of the International Law Students Association (ILSA) and was awarded the ILSA Best Academic International Event Award in 2011.

Athena 
The cultural committee, Athena, organizes various cultural events within the university, including the annual intra-University events Palchin and Rang Manch. It has collaborated with SPICMACAY for promoting Indian art and culture among the youth. It has been host to artists like Maestro Ram Kumar, Ustad Zulfikar Syed, Pandit Kore, violinist T.N. Krishnan, Grammy Award Winner Padmashree Vishwa Mohan Bhatt and the Indian rock band Indian Ocean. It also organizes events such as the weekly film-screening.

Centre for Business and Commercial Laws 
The Center for Business and Commercial Law (C.B.C.L.) came into being in 2008 and was instituted with the aim of facilitating corporate awareness and providing avenues for exploring the world of corporate and commercial laws.
CBCL has been actively involved in undertaking various activities such as publishing monthly e-journals, organizing workshops, panel discussions, paper presentations and weekly corporate news bulletins.

Events concluded in 2009 include the C.B.C.L. workshop on legal drafting conducted by Shishir Vyattaden and Jitendra Tanikela associates, the in-house Paper Presentation Competition on topics involving Corporate Social Responsibility, Limited Liability Partnership and Companies Bill, 2009 and the International Conference on Corporate Social Responsibility and Industrial Disasters.

Popularly known in the university as NLIU's Wall Street Journal, C.B.C.L. has been successfully carrying out the monthly e-journal incorporating the views expressed by industry experts, faculty members, research fellows, alumni and students.

Sports Committee 
The Sports Committee has been active in retaining a sporting culture in the university and actively promotes sports such as football and volleyball. The committee picks teams to represent the University in various National and other inter-college events. It also hosts the annual sports fest of the University  "Virudhaka" since last 10 years, making it the oldest Intra-Law school fest of the country.

Alumni Affairs Cell 
The Alumni Affairs Cell has the student body working for the NLIU Bhopal Alumni Association. It assists and coordinates all activities that aim towards the development of a productive and lifelong relationship between the university and its alumni. The cell strives to communicate the interests and concerns of alumni, worldwide, to the university to encourage inclusive growth and commitment to excellence. The activities carried out by the cell include a monthly newsletter, alumni guest lectures and the annual alumni meet.

Social causes 
NLIU's partnership with NGOs in pursuance of the Supreme Court ruling pertaining to the distribution of compensation to the victims of Bhopal gas tragedy has been widely appreciated. The university adopted the village Kesla to provide legal assistance and creating awareness among the tribal block of the area. The students of the university had been actively associated with the Narmada Bachao Andolan and played an important role in helping the oustees in registering their grievances with the Grievance Redressal Authority (GRA). The university has to its name a partnership with the Bhopal District Courts in organising Lok Adalats, whereby students participate in settling disputes.

People United for Law, Education and Rehabilitation (PULER) is an initiative of the students of the university which aims at imparting legal education and spreading legal awareness, especially in rural areas. The cell has done a commendable job by organizing part-time classes for children and adults in the neighboring villages.

Gallery

See also 
 Rajiv Gandhi National Cyber Law Centre
 Legal education in India
 List of law schools in India
 Bhopal
 CLAT
 Madhya Pradesh High Court

References

External links 

 

Law schools in Madhya Pradesh
National Law Universities
Universities in Bhopal
1997 establishments in Madhya Pradesh
Educational institutions established in 1997